The Ministry of Medical Education is a ministry in the Government of Maharashtra. Ministry is responsible for implementation of laws and acts related to Medical Education and Profession.

The Ministry is headed by a cabinet level minister. Girish Mahajan is current Minister of Medical education.

Head office

List of Cabinet Ministers

List of Ministers of State

List of Principal Secretary

Departments
Ministry is further divided into several departments. 
 AYUSH
 Directorate of Medical Education & Research (DMER)
 Maharashtra University of Health Sciences (MUHS)
 Maharashtra Institute of Mental Health

See also
Maharashtra State Pharmacy Council
Medical education in India

References

External links

Government ministries of Maharashtra
Maharashtra
Maharashtra-related lists
Medical education in India
Medical and health organizations
Maharashtra